"I'll Be There" is a song by English singer-songwriter Jess Glynne. It was released on 4 May 2018 as the first single from her second studio album, Always in Between. It reached number one on the UK Singles Chart on 15 June 2018, becoming Glynne's seventh UK number-one single, as also first as lead artist since "Don't Be So Hard on Yourself" in 2015.

Track listing

Charts

Weekly charts

Year-end charts

Certifications

References

2018 singles
2018 songs
Jess Glynne songs
UK Singles Chart number-one singles
Number-one singles in Scotland
Songs written by Jess Glynne
Songs written by Henrik Barman Michelsen
Songs written by Edvard Forre Erfjord
Songs written by Kamille (musician)
Songs written by Starsmith